Henry Bentley (19 February 1782 – 18 September 1857) was an English first-class cricketer who played for Marylebone Cricket Club (MCC), Middlesex and Hampshire in 68 matches from 1798 to 1822.

Bentley made his first-class debut when still only 16.  A professional player on the MCC staff, he was a right-handed batsman and an occasional wicketkeeper.  He played for the Players in the inaugural Gentlemen v Players match in 1806.

When he retired from playing, he became an umpire and a cricket writer.  He produced the comprehensively titled A Correct Account of all the Cricket Matches which have been played by the Mary-le-bone Club, and all other principal matches, from the Year 1786 to 1822 inclusive (1823), a facsimile edition of which was published in 1997, incorporating additional material by David Rayvern Allen.

References

English cricketers
Hampshire cricketers
Marylebone Cricket Club cricketers
Middlesex cricketers
Cricket historians and writers
1782 births
1857 deaths
English cricketers of 1787 to 1825
Players cricketers
The Bs cricketers
Gentlemen of England cricketers
Non-international England cricketers
E. H. Budd's XI cricketers
George Osbaldeston's XI cricketers
William Ward's XI cricketers